Janamejaya may refer to:
 Janamejaya I - The king belonging to the Kuru dynasty referred to in Vedas. He was a predecessor to the Pandavas and Kauravas
 Janamejaya II - The king belonging to the Kuru dynasty again referred to in Puranas and Mahabharata. He was the grandson of Arjuna and succeeds Dharmaraja as the only surviving member of Kuru dynasty after the Kurukshetra War